Bert Minney (7 January 1914 – 20 May 1999) was an Australian rules footballer who played for the Fitzroy Football Club in the Victorian Football League (VFL).

Notes

External links 
		

1914 births
1999 deaths
Australian rules footballers from Victoria (Australia)
Fitzroy Football Club players